This page lists all described species of the spider family Palpimanidae accepted by the World Spider Catalog :

A

Anisaedus

Anisaedus Simon, 1893
 A. aethiopicus Tullgren, 1910 — Tanzania
 A. gaujoni Simon, 1893 (type) — Ecuador, Peru
 A. levii Chickering, 1966 — Africa
 A. pellucidas Platnick, 1975 — Chile
 A. rufus (Tullgren, 1905) — Argentina
 A. stridulans González, 1956 — Peru

B

Badia

Badia Roewer, 1961
 B. rugosa Roewer, 1961 (type) — Senegal

Boagrius

Boagrius Simon, 1893
 B. pumilus Simon, 1893 (type) — Malaysia (Peninsula), Singapore, Indonesia (Sumatra)
 B. simoni Zonstein & Marusik, 2020 — Malaysia (Borneo)

C

Chedima

Chedima Simon, 1873
 C. purpurea Simon, 1873 (type) — Morocco

Chedimanops

Chedimanops Zonstein & Marusik, 2017
 C. eskovi Zonstein & Marusik, 2017 (type) — Congo
 C. rwenzorensis Zonstein & Marusik, 2017 — Congo

D

Diaphorocellus

Diaphorocellus Simon, 1893
 D. albooculatus Lawrence, 1927 — Namibia
 D. biplagiatus Simon, 1893 (type) — South Africa
 D. helveolus (Simon, 1910) — Botswana
 D. isalo Zonstein & Marusik, 2020 — Madagascar
 D. jocquei Zonstein & Marusik, 2020 — Madagascar
 D. rufus (Tullgren, 1910) — Tanzania

F

Fernandezina

Fernandezina Birabén, 1951
 F. acuta Platnick, 1975 — Brazil
 F. andersoni Cala-Riquelme & Agnarsson, 2018 — Colombia
 F. dasilvai Platnick, Grismado & Ramírez, 1999 — Brazil
 F. divisa Platnick, 1975 — Brazil
 F. eduardoi Cala-Riquelme, Quijano-Cuervo & Sabogal-Gonzáles, 2018 — Colombia
 F. ilheus Platnick, Grismado & Ramírez, 1999 — Brazil
 F. jurubatiba Castro, Baptista, Grismado & Ramírez, 2015 — Brazil
 F. maldonado Platnick, Grismado & Ramírez, 1999 — Peru
 F. nica Ott & Ott, 2014 — Brazil
 F. pelta Platnick, 1975 — Brazil
 F. pulchra Birabén, 1951 (type) — Brazil, Bolivia, Argentina
 F. saira Buckup & Ott, 2004 — Brazil
 F. takutu Grismado, 2002 — Guyana
 F. tijuca Ramírez & Grismado, 1996 — Brazil

H

Hybosida

Hybosida Simon, 1898
 H. dauban Platnick, 1979 — Seychelles
 H. lesserti Berland, 1920 — East Africa
 H. lucida Simon, 1898 (type) — Seychelles
 H. machondogo Oketch & Li, 2020 — Kenya
 H. scabra Simon & Fage, 1922 — East Africa

Hybosidella

Hybosidella Zonstein & Marusik, 2017
 H. etinde Zonstein & Marusik, 2017 (type) — Cameroon

I

Ikuma

Ikuma Lawrence, 1938
 I. spiculosa (Lawrence, 1927) (type) — Namibia
 I. squamata Lawrence, 1938 — Namibia

L

Levymanus

Levymanus Zonstein & Marusik, 2013
 L. dezfulensis Zamani & Marusik, 2020 — Iran
 L. gershomi Zonstein & Marusik, 2013 (type) — Israel, Saudi Arabia, United Arab Emirates
 L. ras Zonstein, Marusik & Kovblyuk, 2017 — Ethiopia

N

Notiothops

Notiothops Platnick, Grismado & Ramírez, 1999
 N. birabeni (Zapfe, 1961) — Chile
 N. campana Platnick, Grismado & Ramírez, 1999 — Chile
 N. cekalovici Platnick, Grismado & Ramírez, 1999 — Chile
 N. huaquen Platnick, Grismado & Ramírez, 1999 — Chile
 N. llolleo Platnick, Grismado & Ramírez, 1999 — Chile
 N. maulensis (Platnick, 1985) — Chile
 N. noxiosus Platnick, Grismado & Ramírez, 1999 (type) — Chile
 N. penai Platnick, Grismado & Ramírez, 1999 — Chile

O

Otiothops

Otiothops MacLeay, 1839
 O. alayoni Cala-Riquelme & Agnarsson, 2014 — Cuba
 O. amazonicus Simon, 1887 — Colombia, Brazil
 O. atalaia Castro, Baptista, Grismado & Ramírez, 2015 — Brazil
 O. atlanticus Platnick, Grismado & Ramírez, 1999 — Brazil
 O. baculus Platnick, 1975 — Brazil
 O. besotes Cala-Riquelme & Agnarsson, 2018 — Colombia
 O. birabeni Mello-Leitão, 1945 — Brazil, Argentina
 O. brevis Simon, 1893 — Venezuela
 O. calcaratus Mello-Leitão, 1927 — Colombia
 O. chicaque Cala-Riquelme, Quijano-Cuervo & Agnarsson, 2018 — Colombia
 O. clavus Platnick, 1975 — Brazil
 O. contus Platnick, 1975 — Brazil
 O. curua Brescovit, Bonaldo & Barreiros, 2007 — Brazil
 O. doctorstrange Cala-Riquelme & Quijano-Cuervo, 2018 — Colombia
 O. dubius Mello-Leitão, 1927 — Brazil
 O. facis Platnick, 1975 — Brazil
 O. franzi Wunderlich, 1999 — Venezuela
 O. fulvus (Mello-Leitão, 1932) — Brazil
 O. germaini Simon, 1927 — Brazil
 O. giralunas Grismado, 2002 — Guyana
 O. goloboffi Grismado, 1996 — Argentina
 O. gounellei Simon, 1887 — Brazil
 O. goytacaz Castro, Baptista, Grismado & Ramírez, 2015 — Brazil
 O. helena Brescovit & Bonaldo, 1993 — Brazil
 O. hoeferi Brescovit & Bonaldo, 1993 — Brazil
 O. iguazu Grismado, 2008 — Argentina
 O. inflatus Platnick, 1975 — Paraguay, Argentina
 O. intortus Platnick, 1975 — Trinidad
 O. kathiae Piacentini, Ávila, Pérez & Grismado, 2013 — Bolivia
 O. kochalkai Platnick, 1978 — Colombia
 O. lajeado Buckup & Ott, 2004 — Brazil
 O. loris Platnick, 1975 — Peru
 O. luteus (Keyserling, 1891) — Brazil
 O. macleayi Banks, 1929 — Panama, Colombia
 O. namratae Pillai, 2006 — India
 O. naokii Piacentini, Ávila, Pérez & Grismado, 2013 — Bolivia
 O. oblongus Simon, 1892 — St. Vincent, Trinidad, Venezuela, Guyana, Brazil
 O. payak Grismado & Ramírez, 2002 — Argentina
 O. pentucus Chickering, 1967 — Virgin Is.
 O. pilleus Platnick, 1975 — Brazil
 O. platnicki Wunderlich, 1999 — Brazil
 O. puraquequara Brescovit, Bonaldo & Barreiros, 2007 — Brazil
 O. recurvus Platnick, 1976 — Brazil
 O. setosus Mello-Leitão, 1927 — Brazil
 O. typicus (Mello-Leitão, 1927) — Brazil
 O. vaupes Cala-Riquelme, Quijano-Cuervo & Agnarsson, 2018 — Colombia
 O. walckenaeri MacLeay, 1839 (type) — Bahama Is., Cuba
 O. whitticki Mello-Leitão, 1940 — Guyana

P

Palpimanus

Palpimanus Dufour, 1820
 P. aegyptiacus Kulczyński, 1909 — Algeria, Tunisia, Egypt, Chad
 P. argentinus Mello-Leitão, 1927 — Argentina
 P. armatus Pocock, 1898 — South Africa
 P. aureus Lawrence, 1927 — Namibia
 P. canariensis Kulczyński, 1909 — Canary Is.
 P. capensis Simon, 1893 — South Africa
 P. crudeni Lessert, 1936 — Mozambique
 P. cyprius Kulczyński, 1909 — Cyprus, Syria, Israel
 P. denticulatus Hernández-Corral & Ferrández, 2017 — Morocco
 P. gibbulus Dufour, 1820 (type) — Mediterranean, Central Asia, Iran?
 P. giltayi Lessert, 1936 — Mozambique
 P. globulifer Simon, 1893 — South Africa
 P. hesperius Simon, 1907 — São Tomé and Príncipe
 P. leppanae Pocock, 1902 — South Africa
 P. lualabanus Benoit, 1974 — Congo
 P. maroccanus Kulczyński, 1909 — Morocco, Algeria
 P. meruensis Tullgren, 1910 — Tanzania
 P. namaquensis Simon, 1910 — Namibia, South Africa
 P. nubilus Simon, 1910 — Namibia
 P. orientalis Kulczyński, 1909 — Albania, Greece, Turkey
 P. paroculus Simon, 1910 — Namibia, South Africa
 P. potteri Lawrence, 1937 — South Africa
 P. processiger Strand, 1913 — Rwanda
 P. pseudarmatus Lawrence, 1952 — South Africa
 P. punctatus Kritscher, 1996 — Malta
 P. schmitzi Kulczyński, 1909 — Syria, Israel
 P. simoni Kulczyński, 1909 — Syria, Lebanon, Israel
 P. sogdianus Charitonov, 1946 — Turkey, Iran, Central Asia
 P. stridulator Lawrence, 1962 — Namibia
 P. subarmatus Lawrence, 1947 — South Africa
 P. transvaalicus Simon, 1893 — South Africa
 P. tuberculatus Lawrence, 1952 — South Africa
 P. uncatus Kulczyński, 1909 — Greece, Turkey, Egypt
 P. vultuosus Simon, 1897 — India
 P. wagneri Charitonov, 1946 — Uzbekistan

S

Sarascelis

Sarascelis Simon, 1887
 S. chaperi Simon, 1887 (type) — Ivory Coast, Guinea-Bissau
 S. junquai Jézéquel, 1964 — Ivory Coast
 S. kilimandjari (Berland, 1920) — Tanzania
 S. lamtoensis Jézéquel, 1964 — Ivory Coast, Ghana
 S. luteipes Simon, 1887 — Congo, São Tomé and Príncipe
 S. raffrayi Simon, 1893 — Singapore, India?
 S. rebiereae Jézéquel, 1964 — Ivory Coast

Scelidocteus

Scelidocteus Simon, 1907
 S. baccatus Simon, 1907 — São Tomé and Príncipe
 S. berlandi Lessert, 1930 — Congo
 S. incisus (Tullgren, 1910) — Tanzania
 S. lamottei Jézéquel, 1964 — Ivory Coast
 S. ochreatus Simon, 1907 — Guinea-Bissau
 S. pachypus Simon, 1907 (type) — West Africa
 S. schoutedeni Benoit, 1974 — Congo
 S. taitave Oketch & Li, 2020 — Kenya
 S. vuattouxi Jézéquel, 1964 — Ivory Coast

Scelidomachus

Scelidomachus Pocock, 1899
 S. socotranus Pocock, 1899 (type) — Yemen (Socotra)

Sceliscelis

Sceliscelis Oketch & Li, 2020
 S. marshi Oketch & Li, 2020 (type) — Kenya

Steriphopus

Steriphopus Simon, 1887
 S. crassipalpis Thorell, 1895 — Myanmar
 S. lacertosus Simon, 1898 — Seychelles
 S. macleayi (O. Pickard-Cambridge, 1873) (type) — Sri Lanka

T

Tibetima

Tibetima Lin & Li, 2020
 T. char Lin & Li, 2020 (type) — China
 T. gyirongensis (Hu & Li, 1987) — China

References

Palpimanidae